Mithat Demirel (born 10 May 1978) is a German former professional basketball player of Turkish descent. He played for Erdemir SK of the Turkish Premier Basketball League before retiring. Formerly a member of Scafati Basket in Italy, Demirel also represented Germany internationally. He retired in 2010 due to an injury to his right eye he had sustained in 2008.

References

1978 births
Living people
Basketball players from Berlin
Alba Berlin players
Beşiktaş men's basketball players
Brose Bamberg players
Galatasaray S.K. (men's basketball) players
German men's basketball players
German people of Turkish descent
Oyak Renault basketball players
Point guards
Turkish men's basketball players
2006 FIBA World Championship players
2002 FIBA World Championship players